Wilhelm Gefeller (27 May 1906 – 25 March 1983) was a German politician of the Social Democratic Party (SPD) and member of the German Bundestag.

Life 
Gefeller had been a member of the SPD since 1945 and was a member of the German Bundestag from 1953 to 1957.

Literature

References

1906 births
1983 deaths
Members of the Bundestag 1953–1957
Members of the Bundestag for the Social Democratic Party of Germany
German trade unionists